The canton of Le Mesnil-Esnard is an administrative division of the Seine-Maritime department, in northern France. It was created at the French canton reorganisation which came into effect in March 2015. Its seat is in Le Mesnil-Esnard.

It consists of the following communes:

Auzouville-sur-Ry 
Bierville
Blainville-Crevon
Bois-d'Ennebourg
Bois-Guilbert
Bois-Héroult
Bois-l'Évêque
Boissay
Boos
Bosc-Bordel
Bosc-Édeline
Buchy
Cailly
Catenay
Elbeuf-sur-Andelle
Ernemont-sur-Buchy
Franqueville-Saint-Pierre
Fresne-le-Plan
Grainville-sur-Ry
Héronchelles
Longuerue
Martainville-Épreville
Le Mesnil-Esnard
Mesnil-Raoul
Montmain 
Morgny-la-Pommeraye
La Neuville-Chant-d'Oisel
Pierreval
Préaux
Rebets
La Rue-Saint-Pierre
Ry
Saint-Aignan-sur-Ry
Saint-André-sur-Cailly
Saint-Denis-le-Thiboult
Sainte-Croix-sur-Buchy
Saint-Germain-des-Essourts
Saint-Germain-sous-Cailly
Servaville-Salmonville
Vieux-Manoir
La Vieux-Rue
Yquebeuf

References

Cantons of Seine-Maritime